In mathematics, Toda–Smith complexes are spectra characterized by having a particularly simple BP-homology, and are useful objects in stable homotopy theory.

Toda–Smith complexes provide examples of periodic self maps. These self maps were originally exploited in order to construct infinite families of elements in the homotopy groups of spheres. Their existence pointed the way towards the nilpotence and periodicity theorems.

Mathematical context 

 
 

If we apply the infinite suspension functor to this map,  and we take the cofiber of the resulting map:

 

Formal definition 

That is, Toda–Smith complexes are completely characterized by their -local properties, and are defined as any object  satisfying one of the following equations:

 

It may help the reader to recall that ,  = .

Examples of Toda–Smith complexes 

 the mod p Moore spectrum, which is

References 

Homotopy theory